José Baraquiel Alcocer was a lawyer, president of the Superior Court of Justice and twice governor of the State of Querétaro, the first time for 3 hours and the second time for 24 hours.

On June 25, 1929, Governor Abraham Araujo was removed from office by the state legislature and José B. Alcocer was appointed interim governor because he was president of the state Superior Court of Justice. He held the position for only 3 hours, handing it over to Ángel Vázquez Mellado.

On June 5, 1930, Governor Vázquez Mellado returned the government to José B. Alcocer, since he was also disqualified by the State Congress. The following day José B. Alcocer handed over the government to Ramón Anaya, appointed interim governor.

Although José B. Alcocer was governor for only three hours, this makes him the shortest government, but not the person with the least time in power as he was governor for the second time for 24 hours more. Fernando Ávalos holds the record as the person who has been governor of Querétaro for the shortest time, only five hours.

References

Bibliography 

 
 </ref><ref>
 

People from Querétaro
20th-century Mexican judges
Governors of Querétaro